Lingolsheim is a commune in the Bas-Rhin department in Grand Est in north-eastern France. The town lies near Strasbourg.

Geography
Lingolsheim is situated southwest of Strasbourg, being a principal suburb between the city centre and Strasbourg Airport. Road access to the city is provided by departmental roads RD 392 and RD 222 and, less directly, by the region's main south-north autoroute.   The commune is on the railway line that connects Strasbourg with Molsheim and Sélestat, and is served by Line B of the Strasbourg tram network as well as several bus routes.

It lies on the small rivers Bruche and Ill.

History

Nineteenth-century industrialisation
Outcomes of the Franco-Prussian War included the annexation in 1871 of Alsace by Germany. A period of rapid modernisation ensued throughout the Strasbourg region, involving population growth, urbanisation and industrial expansion.

For Lingolsheim, a defining feature of this modernisation was the creation and rapid development of a large industrial tannery by Adler & Oppenheimer Aktiengesellschaft.   By 1914 the business employed 2,000 and leather dominated the town's economy.

These years also saw the establishment of a major sand extraction industry.   The local soil, rich in red and white sands, was intensively exploited during the closing years of the nineteenth century.

Twentieth century wars
Lingolsheim was not much affected by the fighting in the First World War, but following the defeat of Germany the whole of Alsace found itself transferred back to France.

The Second World War was more damaging. Immediately before the German invasion of 1940, the town's tanneries were evacuated to Rennes where they remained until after the war. In the autumn of 1940 Lingolsheim was incorporated into "Großstraßburg". The buildings that had housed the tanneries were converted into a large workshop dedicated to repairing tanks. During this war Lingolsheim was subjected to several bombardments.

Population

See also
 Communes of the Bas-Rhin department

References

External links

 Official website

Communes of Bas-Rhin
Bas-Rhin communes articles needing translation from French Wikipedia